Hooch or hootch may refer to:

Places
 Chattahoochee River, United States watercourse nicknamed "The Hooch"

People
 Hooch (surname), a list of fictional characters surnamed Hooch
 De Hooch, a list of Dutch painters surnamed de Hooch
Brad Daugherty (basketball), “The Hooch” being one of his nicknames

Arts, entertainment, and media

Fictional characters
Hooch, the titular dog character in the film Turner & Hooch (1989), starring Tom Hanks

Songs
 "Hooch", a song by Everything, considered to be the band's signature song
 "Hooch", a song from Kelis' album Food
 "Hooch", a song on the Melvins' album Houdini (1993)
 "Hooch", a song from Sum 41's album Does This Look Infected?
 "The Hooch", a song from Travis Scott's album Birds in the Trap Sing McKnight

Food and drinks
 Hooch, liquid produced during the making of sourdough starter
 Hooper's Hooch, a 1990s brand of alcopop (spirit cooler)
 Hoosh or Hooch, a stew made from water, biscuits, and pemmican
 Hooch, a colloquial term for an alcoholic distilled beverage
 Moonshine, illicit distilled spirits

Other uses
 Hooch or hootch, Korean War and Vietnam War slang for a thatched hut or improvised living space (e.g., inside a sand-bagged bunker or improved "foxhole")
 Hootch, military slang for tarpaulin